Thorsten Fink (born 29 October 1967) is a German football coach and a former footballer, currently works as manager of Riga FC.

Career
Fink began his career with Borussia Dortmund's reserve squad before moving to SG Wattenscheid 09, where he helped them gain promotion to the first division of German football, the 1. Bundesliga, in 1990. After the club's relegation in 1994, he moved to Karlsruher SC, where he spent three seasons as a regular and impressed so much that he earned himself a move to the most successful club in Germany, Bayern Munich, in 1997. He subsequently spent seven seasons at Bayern, five of which as a regular, but lost his place in the starting lineup in 2002 and was transferred to the club's reserve squad in the German third division, the Regionalliga, in February 2003, although he managed a return to the Bundesliga squad in late April 2003. In the 2003–04 season, he became a regular in Bayern's reserve squad and only made one, his last, Bundesliga appearance that season, coming on as a substitute against VfL Wolfsburg in September 2003. His contract with Bayern's Bundesliga squad expired in June 2004 and he subsequently only continued to play another two seasons for the club's reserve squad before definitely ending his playing career upon the end of the 2005–06 season.

While playing for Bayern's first team, he helped the team reach the 1999 Champions League final against Manchester United, where Bayern dramatically lost 2–1, conceding two goals in injury time. Fink came on as a substitute late in the game, but his sliced clearance in the 91st minute led to United's equaliser, with the ball breaking to Ryan Giggs whose shot was turned into the net by Teddy Sheringham.

However, Fink still managed to pick up a Champions League winner's medal two years later, as Bayern beat Valencia in the 2001 Champions League final on penalties, although he did not play in the match. He also won four Bundesliga champions titles and three German Cups with the club.

He was forced to end his playing career in 2006 after sustaining cartilage damage in his knee.

Coaching career

Early career
While still playing for Bayern, he had already graduated from Cologne Sport University, in December 2005, after taking a course on coaching. From 5 September 2006, he began coaching Red Bull Salzburg's reserve side. After the departure of Lothar Matthäus as the assistant of head coach Giovanni Trapattoni, Fink stepped up and became the new assistant.

Fink took over as head coach of FC Ingolstadt 04 on 4 January 2008, replacing Jürgen Press, who was sacked on New Year's Day. He appointed Heiko Vogel as his assistant. His first match was a 3–1 win against VfB Stuttgart II. Ingolstadt finished the 2007–08 season in second place. Ingolstadt started the 2008–09 season by losing to Hamburger SV in the first round of the German Cup. Fink was fired on 22 April 2009. He finished with a record of 16 wins, 11 draws, and 17 losses. His final match was a 3–2 loss against SC Freiburg. Ingolstadt were in 17th place when Fink was sacked.

FC Basel
On 9 June 2009, Fink was appointed manager of FC Basel as replacement for Christian Gross. Fink took his assistant Vogel with him. His first match was a 2–0 loss to FC St. Gallen on 12 July 2009. In domestic affairs Basel swept the board in 2009/10. Despite a poor start to the season, Finks' side came back to win the 2010 Super League title on the last day of the season with an away win against favourites BSC Young Boys in the Stade de Suisse. Young prospect Valentin Stocker and club legend Scott Chipperfield gave Basel the goals in the 2–0 victory on 16 May. FC Basel won the Swiss Cup Final 2010 with a 6–0 victory over FC Lausanne-Sport on 9 May. Basel started the 2010–11 season against FC Zürich on 20 July. With Fink Basel also won the 2011 Super League title and the 2011 Uhrencup. Fink left the club in October 2011. His final match was a 5–1 win against FC Schötz in the Swiss Cup.

Fwayo Tembo left FC Basel after he accused club coach Thorsten Fink of making racist remarks towards him during a training session. Fink is reported to have told a collaborator to "get the monkey down from the tree."

Hamburger SV
On 13 October 2011, Fink signed a contract with Hamburger SV to manage the German Bundesliga club through to 2014. with the team in the relegation zone after losing six of their opening eight matches. His first match was a 1–1 draw against VfL Wolfsburg. In HSV's first nine games under Fink they were unbeaten, going into the winter break in thirteenth place. The team eventually finished fifteenth, avoiding a first ever relegation by five points.

In 2012–13, HSV recorded a much improved seventh-place finish. However, during the season Hamburg lost to Karlsruher SC in the first round of the German Cup. the team equaled the club's record Bundesliga defeat, losing 9–2 at the Allianz Arena to FC Bayern Munich.

Following a run of disastrous results during which Hamburger SV picked up only four points from their first five league games of the 2013–14 Bundesliga season and with the club in 15th place in the league table, Fink was sacked with immediate effect on 16 September 2013. "We were no longer confident that Thorsten Fink was capable of turning the team around and that was why we took this decision (to sack Fink). Also it is apparent that he had 'outside troubles' which could have contributed to his poor results. His final match was a 6–2 loss to Borussia Dortmund. He finished with a record of 23 wins, 18 draws, and 27 losses in 68 matches.

APOEL
On 10 January 2015, Fink signed a contract until the end of the 2014–15 season, with the option of a further season with the reigning Cypriot champions APOEL FC, replacing Giorgos Donis who was fired on 6 January 2015. His first match was a 2–1 loss to AEL Limassol. Following a run of disappointing performances and one day after a questionable 1–0 loss to Apollon Limassol, Fink was sacked by APOEL on 11 May 2015, although at that moment the team were two points clear at the top of the league with only two matches remaining.

Austria Wien

Fink was hired as Austria Wien's head coach on 28 May 2015. He was given a two-year contract plus an option and started in the 2015–16 season. He was also in negotiations with Hannover 96. He had his first training on 22 June 2015. On 17 July 2015, in his first match, Austria won 3–0 in the Austrian Cup. On 26 July 2015, in his first league match, Austria defeated Wolfsberg 2–0 away from home. On 23 April 2016, Austria Wien defeated SV Mattersburg 9–0. He finished the 2015–16 season in third place.

Austria Wien started the 2016–17 season with a 1–0 win against Kukësi in the Europa League on 14 July 2016.

After bad results and standing in seventh place Fink was dismissed on 25 February. His final match was a 2–1 loss to Admira Wacker Mödling on 24 February 2018.

Grasshoppers

Fink became manager of Grasshoppers on 23 April 2018. His first match was a 1–0 win against FC Lausanne-Sport on 28 April 2018. He started the 2018–19 season with a 2–0 loss against BSC Young Boys.

After disastrous results of only one point out of his last eight matches in the Swiss Super League and standing in last place Fink was sacked on 4 March 2019. His last match was a 1–3 loss against FC Luzern on 2 March 2019.

Vissel Kobe
On 8 June 2019, Fink was appointed as the new manager of Vissel Kobe, replacing the outgoing Juan Manuel Lillo.

Fink managed to bring in the first two titles in club history of Vissel Kobe, winning the Emperors Cup and Japanese Super Cup in 2020.

On 22 September 2020, Fink decided to resign to return to his family.

Riga FC
In January 2022, Fink was appointed Head Coach of Riga FC. On 16 May 2022, Fink left Riga to take on a managerial job at another club.

Career statistics

Club

1.Includes German League Cup and Intercontinental Cup.

Managerial statistics

Honours

Player
Bayern Munich
Bundesliga: 1998–99, 1999–2000, 2000–01, 2002–03
DFB-Pokal: 1997–98, 1999–2000, 2002–03
UEFA Champions League: 2000–01
Intercontinental Cup: 2001

Manager
Basel
Swiss Super League: 2009–10, 2010–11
Swiss Cup: 2009–10

Vissel Kobe
Emperor's Cup: 2019
Japanese Super Cup: 2020

References

External links

1967 births
Living people
German footballers
Germany under-21 international footballers
Association football midfielders
Bundesliga players
2. Bundesliga players
Borussia Dortmund II players
SG Wattenscheid 09 players
Karlsruher SC players
FC Bayern Munich footballers
FC Bayern Munich II players
German football managers
German expatriate football managers
German expatriate sportspeople in Cyprus
German expatriate sportspeople in Switzerland
German expatriate sportspeople in Japan
Expatriate football managers in Cyprus
Expatriate football managers in Switzerland
Expatriate football managers in Japan
Expatriate football managers in Latvia
FC Bayern Munich non-playing staff
FC Ingolstadt 04 managers
FC Basel managers
Hamburger SV managers
APOEL FC managers
FK Austria Wien managers
Grasshopper Club Zürich managers
Vissel Kobe managers
Riga FC managers
Regionalliga managers
Swiss Super League managers
Bundesliga managers
Cypriot First Division managers
Austrian Football Bundesliga managers
J1 League managers
Latvian Higher League managers
UEFA Champions League winning players
Footballers from Dortmund
West German footballers
German expatriate sportspeople in Latvia